General elections were held in Tunisia on 25 October 2009. Results released on 26 October 2009 indicated a substantial victory for incumbent President Zine El Abidine Ben Ali, who won the reelection for a fifth five-year term, and the governing Constitutional Democratic Rally. It was the last election contested under the Ben Ali regime, prior to the Tunisian Revolution.

Observers
The African Union sent a team of election observers to cover the election.  The delegation was led by Benjamin Bounkoulou who described the election as "free and fair". However, a spokesperson from the United States State Department indicated that Tunisia did not allow international monitoring of elections, but the U.S. was still committed to working with the president of Tunisia and its government. There also were reports of mistreatment of an opposition candidate.

Results

President
The Interior Ministry released the official results for the election on Monday 26 October 2009.  Voter turnout was recorded at 89.40% with 4,447,388 of Tunisia's 5.3 million registered voters participating.  In the presidential race, incumbent president Zine El Abidine Ben Ali won 89.62% of the vote.  His nearest rivals were Mohamed Bouchiha with 5.01% of the vote and Ahmed Inoubli with 3.80%, and Ahmed Brahum with 1.57%.

Parliament
In the Chamber of Deputies election, the Democratic Constitutional Rally, which had governed continuously from Tunisia's independence from France in 1956 until the Tunisian Revolution, won 84.59% of the vote and 161 seats.  The Movement of Socialist Democrats won 16 seats with 4.63% of the vote, the Popular Unity Party won 12 seats and 3.39% of votes, The Unionist Democratic Union won 9 seats with 2.56%. The remaining 16 seats were divided between the Social Liberal Party, who won eight seats, the Green Party for Progress, who won six and the Movement Ettajdid who won two seats.

References

External links

Presidential and Legislative Elections in Tunisia - 2009

Media
Ben Ali reelected with 89 per cent - Radio France Internationale 
Unsurprising victory for Ben Ali - Radio France Internationale 
Final results give President Ben Ali a fifth term - France 24 
Ben Ali wins unsurprising landslide in presidential election - France 24 

Tunisia
Elections in Tunisia
2009 in Tunisia
Presidential elections in Tunisia
October 2009 events in Africa